Chen Kuan-tai (born 24 September 1945) is a Chinese Hong Kong martial artist and martial arts film star.

Background
A former fireman, he won a world's kungfu Championship in 1969. He has primarily appeared in Shaw Brothers productions, and was one of the first solid trained, martial arts stars employed by the company. One of his first roles in a Shaw work was in the 1969 film after high school The Chinese Boxer, along with Jimmy Wang Yu.

Chen branched out as an actor with Boxer from Shantung a box-office smash in Hong Kong. His roles in The Tea House and its sequel Big Brother Cheng, both directed by Chih-hung Kwei increase His fame. These films gave Chen status as a "legitimate actor". After starring in the box office successes Challenge of the Masters and Executioners from Shaolin, both helmed by the legendary martial arts director Lau Kar-leung, Chen left the Shaw Brothers Studio.

While away from Shaw, Chen directed and starred in the 1977 film Iron Monkey. Chen later returned to the Shaw Brothers in the films Crippled Avengers (directed by Chang Cheh), Killer Constable (directed by Chih-hung Kwei), and 3 Evil Masters (co-starring Yuen Tak of the Seven Little Fortunes).
 
To date Chen has starred in over 100 films, around 80 of which were with Shaw Brothers. He appeared in Wilson Yip's 2006 martial arts-fantasy Dragon Tiger Gate, and in the 2007 remake of the King Hu classic, The Valiant Ones New. He recently played the role of Gold Lion in the Rza's directorial debut The Man with the Iron Fists.

Personal life
Chen married at least four times. In 1976, he married a fellow Shaw Brothers actress Cai Zhen-ni (蔡珍妮), better known under her stage name of Ying Ying (盈盈), and had a daughter, Chen Yong-xi (陈泳希), with her. Chen and Cai divorced in the following year. He later married a Taiwanese actress and singer Fong Yee-chun (方怡珍) and had a son, Chen Jun-xiang (陈骏祥), with her in 1978. Chen and Fong later divorced. In 1990, he married Zhao Ting-ting (赵婷婷) in Australia, but they divorced a few years later. In 2017, at the age of 73, Chen married a 43 year old Tang Liping (汤利萍).Currently Chen resides in Kolkata,India and is the owner of the reputed 'Jimmy's Kitchen'.

Filmography

References

External links

1945 births
Living people
Shaw Brothers Studio
Hong Kong male film actors
Hong Kong male television actors
Male actors from Guangdong
20th-century Hong Kong male actors
21st-century Hong Kong male actors